The 1937 Iowa Hawkeyes football team represented the University of Iowa in the 1937 Big Ten Conference football season. This was Irl Tubbs' first season as head coach of the Hawkeyes.

Schedule

References

Iowa
Iowa Hawkeyes football seasons
Iowa Hawkeyes football